(born August 31, 1956) is a Japanese former television performer and a founding member of the band Rats & Star. Tashiro was a tenor singer for Rats & Star and later made a name for himself as a TV entertainer in Japan. He also directed a movie after his band broke up.

His arrest for filming up women's skirts in September 2000 marked the beginning of Tashiro's troubles with the law.

Early life 
Masashi Tashiro was born on August 31, 1956 in Saga Prefecture. His father, the manager of a cabaret chain, ran off with another woman. His parents subsequently divorced and he was raised by his mother alone. In 1961, when Tashiro was six years old, he and his mother moved to Tokyo and he enrolled in a missionary kindergarten. In 1963, he enrolled in Toyama Elementary School in Shinjuku. At the age of thirteen, while a student at Okubo Junior High School, his mother remarried and he chose to enroll in a higher grade at a private high school and live with his father so as not to be financially dependent on his mother's new husband.

In 1972, after graduating from Nakase Junior High School in March of that year, he entered Shibaura Institute of Technology Senior High School to study mechanical engineering. At Shibaura he met Masayuki Suzuki. They later formed the band The Chanels. Tashiro and Suzuki were considered juvenile delinquents at the time.

He was allegedly involved in fights, motorcycle gang problems, partying at a disco, and going girl-hunting every day during his time in high school. He was arrested by the police for assault. He met his present wife at the end of his junior year in high school (however, he and his wife are now separated due to his various scandals and arrests).

In March 1975, he graduated from Shibaura Institute of Technology Senior High School. It was around this time that he started driving. His first car was a Sunny. His subsequent cars were a Gloria, a Camaro, a Ford, a Prelude, and a Mercedes-Benz. It had become an obsession of his.

After graduating from Shibaura Institute of Technology Senior High School in March 1975, Masayuki Suzuki formed the Japanese doo-wop band The Chanels with Tashiro, Nobuyoshi Kuwano and others that same year. Tashiro sang baritone, while Suzuki was the lead singer, and Kuwano was the trumpet player.

In June 1975, Tashiro ran away from home after getting into a big fight with his father. He was later taken in by Chanels member Hiroyuki Kuboki and worked as a clerk at the same gas station. He lived in the company dormitory for two years. He then became a truck driver after being hired by the president of a trucking company who was a customer of Tashiro's gas station in 1978. Although he had already formed the band, he reportedly continued to work as a truck driver because he thought that "the entertainment world is scary".

Entertainment career

The Chanels and Rats and Star 
The Chanels were formed in 1975, and began performing as an amateur band in 1976. They came in first place on a Japanese television program called  and won a prize in a music contest sponsored by Yamaha.

Tashiro made his debut as a member of the group in 1980 and they came to be widely known for adopting a rhythm and blues style. The four main singers, including Tashiro, wore blackface using shoe polish and they became famous and popular. Their first single, "Runaway" sold more than 1 million copies. Their May 1981's single "Hurricane" was covered by Puffy AmiYumi in 2001. In 1983, the group changed their name to Rats & Star because of the similarly named French fashion brand Chanel.

The band practically dissolved in 1986 because the leader Suzuki launched a solo single, . Tashiro, appeared on TV music shows like  and worked as a lyricist for singer and actress Kyōko Koizumi, gaining enough popularity in Japan that he released an LP,  as a solo artist.

In March 1996, Rats & Star's members got together for six months and covered Eiichi Ohtaki's song  in April of that year. The song was a big hit and they appeared on NHK's Kōhaku Uta Gassen on New Year's Eve that year.

Comedian 
After Rats & Star broke up, Tashiro's comedic talent was discovered by Ken Shimura, a member of the comedic group The Drifters, and he became a television comedian. On July 10, 1988, he opened a tarento shop, called  after his nickname, in Takeshita Street, Shibuya, Tokyo. Tashiro appeared in many television commercials, hosted many television programs, wrote an autobiography and a book on puns, directed a movie and starred as the main character in the Famicom/MSX2 action game Tashiro Masashi no Princess ga Ippai, released in Japan on October 27, 1989.

The video game was not successful at the time it was published. However, after his later scandals and arrests, it started to fetch very high prices on Internet auctions like Yahoo!.

Tashiro also appeared as a film actor in Shizuka Ijuin's film Crêpe in October 1993. He co-starred with actress Kaho Minami.

Controversies

Voyeurism 

On September 24, 2000, Tashiro was sent to the prosecutor's office for filming up a woman's skirt with a camcorder in Tōkyū Tōyoko Line Toritsu-Daigaku Station in Meguro, Tokyo. The "mini ni tako" remark became infamous in the Japanese news media.

In December 2000, Tashiro was fined 50,000 yen (about US$430) for the voyeurism. He was barred from working in the entertainment industry temporarily by his entertainment agency, MTM Productions, and his comment was "I wish miniskirts were obliterated from the Earth."  While he was barred, Tashiro did volunteer work such as carrying the wash and serving meals in a nursing home 3 days a week. On June 28, 2001, he announced his return to the entertainment world by saying, 

In July 2001, Tashiro appeared as a guest on television programs such as Downtown DX,  and Mecha-Mecha Iketeru!. To become a regular in another program, he was challenged to travel from Tokyo to Okinawa without being discovered by anyone. He lost the contest when he was found out in Kyoto and 100 pictures of him were taken, but the public liked his stunt and his popularity soared back.

On July 6, 2015, Tashiro was sent to the prosecutor's office for filming up a woman's skirt with his mobile phone in Tōkyū Den-en-toshi Line Futako-Tamagawa Station in Setagaya, Tokyo.

Tashiro once hosted a combative sport program, Fuji Television's SRS, with actress Norika Fujiwara. It was later found out that he was warned many times by the staff, who became irritated with his habit of sneaking into the ladies' bathroom (possibly with camera equipment) and not emerging again for hours afterwards. Additionally, it was revealed that Fujiwara and other female television stars changed their clothes in the ladies' toilet during the time Tashiro was hiding inside. The staff associated with the show were suspicious that Tashiro did set up a small, transmitting camera in the toilet room.

Drug use

First trial 
On December 9, 2001, Tashiro was arrested for peeping through the bathroom window of a man's house near his home in Kita-senzoku, Ōta, Tokyo by Den-en-chōfu police. According to the police, the 32-year-old man spotted Tashiro and ran after him for 300 meters wearing only a bath towel around his waist, eventually catching him and delivering him to the station. An eyewitness reported that Tashiro put on a cap like a ski cap, spoke loudly  and  when he was caught, and that there was a camcorder in the vicinity of the scene recording. He was released on bail without punishment.

However, Tashiro was arrested for possession and use of amphetamine on December 12, 2001. Seven police detectives carried out a home search in Tashiro's house as a corroborative investigation into the peeping incident and discovered a bag containing 0.4 ~ 0.9g of speed. Tashiro stated that, "I bought it", but how he used it was unknown because a syringe used to inject drugs was not discovered in the home search. He was detained as a suspect at the police station after his arrest until February 1 of the next year. As a result, he was dismissed by MTM Production on the same day because of the repeated scandals.

On December 28, 2001, Tashiro was prosecuted for violation of the Stimulant Drugs Control Law. He testified that, "I used drugs to get rid of stress and tension before appearing on a TV program" for the investigation by the Tokyo District Prosecution Office. He also said, "I lived confined to the house and I began to worry. From about this April, I used it once every few days". According to an indictment, he warmed amphetamine over a fire and absorbed it in his home's video room. His first trial for drug use and other crimes was in Tokyo District Court on February 1, 2002. Judgement was given on the case in the same court on February 8, 2002, where he was found guilty. He was given a three years suspended sentence of two years imprisonment.

In 2003 he made a recorded guest appearance in TBS's  on New Year's Eve. This is his last public appearance in a television program to date.

Second trial 
After 10 p.m. on September 20, 2004, Tashiro was arrested for violation of the Firearms and Swords Control Law in a street in Nakano because he had a butterfly knife with a blade 8 centimeters long. He shared his car on the street with a female acquaintance then and the police questioned them. After the investigation, it was learned that he had about 2g of amphetamines and about 4g of marijuana in a rucksack. As a result, he was arrested on the evening of the next day because a woman with him said "This rucksack is his" and he admitted it. After this incident, former Rats & Star member Masayuki Suzuki apologized for Tashiro's crimes in his place. Tashiro stated that the pressure of stardom contributed to his addiction to drugs.

Following this arrest, Tashiro was harshly criticized by many of his former co-workers, who said:

Tashiro was virtually retired from the entertainment world and was treated like he never existed. From here on, the media would refer to him as the "former entertainer", and all the recordings and pictures taken when he was a Chanels/Rats & Star member were almost never broadcast anymore, and if they were, Tashiro's voice would be lowered to a hush or removed entirely, and no part of his body would be shown. Newspapers and magazines tacitly agreed not to talk about him at all. In an episode of a comedic duo Bakusho Mondai, host Hikari Ota accidentally said his full name. In , Sayaka Aoki, while displaying only part of his name, said "I put a camera in the chest drawer", which caused a general laugh. On the other hand, the part of Ken Shimura's commemorative speech held for the DVD release of one of his programs where he said "Have you disappeared like Takafumi Horie when you were knocked-out? I wanted to release this five years ago" was not broadcast.

Tashiro was arrested for possession of amphetamines on September 21, 2004. On February 7, 2005, he was sentenced to 3 years and 6 months imprisonment. On June 26, 2008, he was released from prison.

Cocaine incident 
On September 16, 2010, Tashiro was arrested along with a 50-year-old woman in a parking lot at Red Brick Park in Yokohama for possession of cocaine. According to police he was in possession of two bags of cocaine, and admitted "It is for my own use". Tashiro said he bought cocaine from a DJ. The Yokohama District Public Prosecutors' Office indicted him on October 6, 2010.

This incident outraged and disappointed his former co-workers and friends again, and many of them made comments publicly regarding this incident. His bandmate Masayuki Suzuki expressed his disappointment and frustration, stating "I have no idea what to say about this affair. I just wanted him to remember the very hard time not only his family and those around him but also that he himself has had. He really is a bonehead."

Torata Nanbu, leader of Tokyo Shock Boys, one of the people who had been supporting Tashiro for the sake of his comeback, said "My heart is aching very much. I don't mean to beat him up, but he makes me feel empty inside. I wonder if the drug might be more fascinating for him than the feeling of returning to the entertainment industry," and concluded, "I cannot take any more. Regrettably, this is the end. It is no longer possible for him to restore his reputation." Tashiro had been scheduled to appear on a radio program named Tashiro Nakamura Nanbu Akua-Chan, broadcast by Rainbowtown FM, aimed at supporting his comeback, but the program was cancelled.

Tashiro was released on parole on July 20, 2014. Thereafter, he began his stay at DARC Jeanne (DARC stands for Drug Addiction Rehabilitation Center. Ironically, with Masashi Tashiro being known for his puns, the name of this rehab center is also a pun on Jeanne D'Arc). He appeared at a press conference on March 18, 2015, announcing the opening of the Asagaya Loft A.

2019 arrest 
Tashiro was arrested again on November 6, 2019 on suspicion of drug use.

Car accident 
There was a rumor that Tashiro would be coming back to the public screens in spring 2004. However, he once again found himself in legal trouble for causing a car accident on the Ōme road in Suginami. According to news reports, at about 1 am on June 16, 2004, he crashed into an 18-year-old vocational school student on a motorcycle after making an illegal U-turn. The victim had his left thigh broken and suffered an injury that would take 2 years to heal completely.

"Person of the Year" incident
In 2001, users of internet forum 2channel voted en-masse Tashiro as Time Magazine's Person of the Year. This act was soon dubbed the "Tashiro Festival" (Tashiro Matsuri, 田代祭) by 2ch users. 2channel programmers developed many scripts such as "Tashiro Cannon" (Tashiro-hō, 田代砲), "Mega particle Tashiro Cannon" (Mega-ryūshi Tashiro-hō, メガ粒子田代砲), "25 repeated blows Tashiro Cannon" (Nijū-go renda Tashiro-hō, 25連打田代砲) "Super Tashiro Cannon" (Chō Tashiro-hō, 超田代砲) to be able to vote repeatedly. "Super Tashiro cannon" was so powerful that it crashed Time's server. Afterwards, "Satellite Cannon -Tashiro-" was developed, but it was not deployed. Due to the votes of 2channel users, he got to the No. 1 position temporarily on December 21, 2001. However, Time's staff realized that something was unusual, and Tashiro was removed as a candidate.

Past main programs

Television 
  (Fuji Television)
  (Fuji Television)
  (Fuji Television)
  (Fuji Television)
  (Fuji Television)
  (Fuji Television)
  (Fuji Television)
  (Fuji Television)
  (Fuji Television)
  (TBS)
  (TV Asahi)
  (NTV)
  (Friday, TV Asahi)
  (MBS)

Radio 
  (Thurdsday, TBS Radio) – October 1986 ~ March 1987
  (QR)
  (LF)

Musical works 
See Rats & Star for works as Chanels and Rats & Star.
  (August 27, 1986)
  (September 21, 1987 as "Shinnosuke & Marcy")
  (November 2, 1988 as Ken Shimura & Masashi Tashiro and Daijōbudā family)
  (July 1, 1994 as Marcy & Izumi)
  (December 17, 1993 as Ken & Marcy)
  (March 8, 1995 as Masashi Tashiro & Kuniko Asagi)
 (August 14, 2010 as Marcy & Frontier Create)

Books 
  (May 1988, Kōdansha) – 
  (April 1994, Magazine house) – 
  (October 1993, Japan literary arts company) – 
  (July 2002 K2 publishing sale) –

See also 
 Ken Shimura
 Takeshi Kitano
 Akiko Wada
 Kazuhide Uekusa
 Sosuke Sumitani
 Voyeurism

Members of Rats and Star era 
 Masayuki Suzuki
 Nobuyoshi Kuwano

References

External links 
  
 Masashi Tashiro's official blog 

1956 births
Living people
Rats & Star members
Japanese male comedians
Japanese prisoners and detainees
Japanese people convicted of drug offenses
Musicians from Saga Prefecture
Singers from Tokyo
Comedians from Tokyo
Prisoners and detainees of Japan
20th-century comedians
21st-century comedians
20th-century Japanese male singers
21st-century Japanese male singers
21st-century Japanese criminals